The GF World Cup '06 was an eight-team tournament in women's handball, held in Atletion, Århus, Denmark between 14 November and 19 November 2006. It was the second installment of the Handball World Cup, and the tournament was organised by the Danish Handball Association. It was an invitational tournament with no affiliation to the International Handball Federation, but five of the top eight women's teams in the world competed at this event, including permanent representatives Sweden and Denmark. Defending champions Norway did not take part. The tournament is said to be the world's most prestigious non-IHF handball tournament for women, and most matches in the tournament were broadcast live on Eurosport.  Defending world champions Russia won the tournament, after a last-minute victory over Romania in the final, a replay of the 2005 World Championship final.

Results

In both groups, the semi-finalists were determined before the final round of games.

Group A

14 November 2006

15 November 2006

16 November 2006

Group B

14 November 2006

15 November 2006

16 November 2006

Knockouts

Semi finals
18 November 2006

3rd/4th place
19 November 2006

Final
19 November 2006

References

External links
Tournament site

Handball World Cup
2006 in Danish sport
GF World Cup
International handball competitions hosted by Denmark